The 1987 Miami Dolphins season was the team's 22nd as a member of the National Football League (NFL). The Dolphins improved upon their previous season's output of 8–8, losing one fewer game. Despite the improvement the team failed to reach the playoffs. This was also the first season the Dolphins played their home games at Joe Robbie Stadium. Their first game at Joe Robbie Stadium involved replacement players, as 25,867 fans saw the Dolphins defeat the Kansas City Chiefs.

Offseason

NFL draft

Personnel

Staff

NFL replacement players
After the league decided to use replacement players during the NFLPA strike, the following team was assembled:
Kyle Mackey, whose father, Dee Mackey, played for Don Shula with the Baltimore Colts, served as a replacement quarterback.

Roster

Schedule

Season summary

Week 1

Miami Dolphins punter Reggie Roby injured in the game, forcing Don Strock to punt in the emergency situation.  Additionally, with 2:22 left in the game Dan Marino was injured forcing Strock to fill in at the quarterback position as well, nearly mounting a winning comeback drive.

Week 6

Week 14

    
    
    
    
    
    
    

Dan Marino 22/50, 393 Yds
Mark Duper 6 Rec, 170 Yds

Standings

References

External links
 1987 Miami Dolphins at Pro-Football-Reference.com

Miami Dolphins seasons
Miami Dolphins
Miami Dolphins